Edward Lopez may refer to:

 Edward J. Lopez, American economist
 R. Edward Lopez (1953–2005), American newsman and morning radio personality